The Bushranger is a 1976 Australian TV movie.

References

External links

Australian drama television films
1976 television films
1976 films
1976 drama films
1970s English-language films
1970s Australian films